Hello-Goodbye is a 1970 British comedy film starring Michael Crawford, and was the final film directed by Jean Negulesco.

Plot
Harry England, a British car salesman on a trip to France, meets a Baroness, "Dany", when her Rolls-Royce breaks down. They spend a few days together and become lovers before she disappears one night, but Harry does not know her surname.

The Baron then hires Harry to teach his teenage son about cars on their country estate. Harry encounters the Baroness again and their affair continues. Harry falls in love and asks the Baroness to leave the Baron, who has taken up with a lady of his own.

Cast

Production
Darryl F. Zanuck had a long history of trying to turn his European mistresses into film starshe had previously done this with Bella Darvi, Juliette Gréco and Irina Demick.  Hello Goodbye was created as a vehicle for Gilles, his latest mistress, and was the first production Zanuck personally supervised since he inserted Demick in The Longest Day (1962).

Filming started on the French Riviera under the direction of Ronald Neame. He quit the film after a few weeks due to disagreements with Zanunck. He was replaced by Jean Negulesco, who only did the movie as a favor to Zanuck.

Box office
According to Fox records, the film required $7,225,000 in rentals to break even. It failed to do so; by 11 December 1970, the film had only made $2,335,000.

References

External links
 
 
 
 
 
 
 
 Hello Goodbye at Letterbox DVD

1970 films
Films directed by Jean Negulesco
Films scored by Francis Lai
British comedy films
20th Century Fox films
1970s English-language films
1970s British films